Washington station may refer to:

Railroad stations 
 Washington station (Los Angeles Metro)
 Washington station (Missouri), an Amtrak station in Washington, Missouri
 Washington station (New Jersey), a disused station in Washington, New Jersey
 Washington Junction station (PAAC), a station on the Port Authority of Allegheny County's light rail network
 Washington railway station (England), in Washington, Tyne-and-Wear
 Washington Union Station, a major transit hub in Washington, D.C.
 Washington station, on Line 1 of the Guadalajara light rail system

Regional public transportation stations

Chicago Transit Authority (CTA) 
 Washington/Dearborn, in the Blue Line subway
 Washington/Wabash, Loop station 
 Washington/Wells, Loop station
 Washington/State, an abandoned "L" station on the Red Line

Massachusetts Bay Transportation Authority (MBTA) 
The Washington Street Tunnel (Boston), built in 1908, carries the Orange Line metro line with four stations directly under Washington Street
Downtown Crossing station was known as Washington station from 1967 to 1987; the lower level was named Washington (sometimes Washington Street) from its 1915 opening
The Washington Street Elevated carried the southern section of the Orange Line from 1901 to 1987, with six stations
Silver Line (MBTA)#Washington Street: SL4 and SL5, two routes of the Silver Line bus rapid transit system, opened in 2002
Washington Street station (MBTA) on the Green Line B branch in Allston
Washington Square station (MBTA) on the Green Line C branch in Brookline
East Somerville station, under construction on the Green Line D branch in Somerville as part of the Green Line Extension, was known as Washington Street during much of planning.

See also

 Washington (disambiguation)